Hypsopygia haemograpta is a species of snout moth in the genus Hypsopygia. It was described by Edward Meyrick in 1934. It is found in the Democratic Republic of the Congo.

References

Moths described in 1934
Pyralini